Interbaltija is a real estate company which has been working in the Latvian market more than 20 years (founded in 1992). The head office is located in Riga. Company and employees' are certified real estate professionals, confirmed by international “Recognized European Valuer” (REV) and the Latvian Real Estate Association (LANIDA).

Interbaltija services 
 Real estate valuation
 Business valuation
 Movable property valuation
 Real estate development
 Property sale
 Construction expertise
 Energy audit

External links 
 http://varianti.lv/?locale=lv
 http://ibaltija.lv/lv/par-interbaltija 
 https://www.riga.lv/LV/PostingData/News/2014/5/tiks-atklata-pieminas-plaksne-janim-grestem.htm?WBCMODE=PresentationUnpublished
 http://www.la.lv/grestes-pieminai/
 http://www.intereses.lv/aicinam-uz-jana-grestes-pieminas-plaksnes-atklasanu/
 http://www.iksd.riga.lv/public/60281.html

Companies based in Riga
Real estate companies of Latvia
1992 establishments in Latvia